NGC 1058 is a Seyfert Type 2 galaxy in the NGC 1023 Group, located in the Perseus constellation. It is approximately 27.4 million light years from Earth and has an apparent magnitude of 11.82.

References

External links
 
 

Unbarred spiral galaxies
1058
Perseus (constellation)
02193
10314
NGC 1023 Group
Seyfert galaxies